Daisy Jeanne MacKenzie (known as Jeanne, pronounced Jean, 30 January 1922 – 16 October 1986) was an English author of non-fiction. She was the first wife of the journalist and academic Norman MacKenzie.

Biography
Daisy Jeanne Sampson was born in St Helens, England, on 30 January 1922, the daughter of Leonard Sampson (1894–1977), a leather factor, and his wife, Emily, née Middlehurst (1894–1984). Her elder brother was the academic and peace activist Ronald V. Sampson (1918–1999). She was brought up in the Moss Bank area of St Helens and attended Cowley Girls’ School, the local Grammar School. After graduating from the London School of Economics in 1943, she worked as a civil servant during the Second World War and subsequently as a publisher's reader for Hamish Hamilton and in the 1960s as a counsellor with the Marriage Guidance Council.

She authored several books, both independently and with her husband. One of these was Australian Paradox, recounting a year-long stay in Australia whilst her husband did research for the Social Science Research Council of Australia, the result of which was his important survey Women in Australia (1962). She was elected a fellow of the Royal Society of Literature in 1978, together with her husband Norman.

She died of ovarian cancer in 1986. She was survived by her husband and two daughters.

Books
 An Authentic and Faithful History of the Mysterious Murder of Maria Marten (1948) with Norman MacKenzie
 Australian Paradox (1961)
 The Time Traveller: The Life of H.G. Wells (1973) with Norman MacKenzie
 The Diary of Beatrice Webb, 4 vols, edited with Norman MacKenzie: (1982) ; (1983) ; (1984) ; (1985) 
 The First Fabians (1977) with Norman MacKenzie
 Dickens: A Life (1979) with Norman MacKenzie
 A Victorian Courtship: The Story of Beatrice Potter and Sidney Webb (1979) 
 Cycling (1981) as editor  
 The Children of the Souls: A Tragedy of the First World War (1986)

References

External links 

 Norman Ian and Jeanne MacKenzie papers at the Sophia Smith Collection, Smith College Special Collections

1922 births
1986 deaths
20th-century English writers
English biographers
Alumni of the London School of Economics
People from St Helens, Merseyside